John Bouland (died 1 December 1400) was a Canon of Windsor from 1381 to 1400 and Archdeacon of St David's from 1388.

Career
He was appointed:
Rector of Artureth, 1361
Prebendary of Lichfield Cathedral 1386
Archdeacon of St David's 1388

He was appointed to the second stall in St George's Chapel, Windsor Castle in 1381, and held the stall until 1400.

Notes 

1400 deaths
Canons of Windsor
Archdeacons of St Davids
Year of birth missing